Santubong may refer to:

Mount Santubong, Sarawak
Santubong (federal constituency), represented in the Dewan Rakyat